Harold Digby Fitzgerald Creighton (11 September 1927 – 3 July 2003) was a British businessman and machine tool pioneer, who bought The Spectator magazine in 1967 for £75,000.

In 1947, he was commissioned as a 2nd lieutenant in the Royal Armoured Corps and served in Egypt and the Far East. After completing his National Service, he joined a tin-smelting business in Malaya (now known as Malaysia) and returned to Britain, where he eventually became Chairman of the Scottish Machine Tool Corporation of Glasgow.

In 1967, bought The Spectator, a politically conservative, weekly magazine. In 1973, he took over as editor although he had no prior experience as a journalist, after sacking the incumbent editor, George Gale. He edited the magazine until 1975, when he sold it for £75,000 to Henry Keswick. During his tenure, the magazine fervently opposed British entry into the European Economic Community.

Education
Creighton was educated at Haileybury and Imperial Service College, an independent school for boys (now co-educational), at Hertford Heath, near to the county town of Hertford in Hertfordshire.

References

People educated at Haileybury and Imperial Service College
1927 births
2003 deaths
English magazine editors
The Spectator editors
Royal Armoured Corps officers
20th-century British Army personnel